The 2000 DirecTV 500 was a NASCAR Winston Cup Series stock car race held on April 2, 2000, at Texas Motor Speedway in Fort Worth, Texas. Contested over 334 laps on the 1.5-mile (2.414 km) asphalt Quad oval. Dale Earnhardt Jr. of Dale Earnhardt, Inc. won the race, his first career Winston Cup Series victory. Jeff Burton finished second and Bobby Labonte finished third.

It was the only Cup race for Adam Petty.

Background

The track's turns are banked at twenty-four degrees, while the front stretch, the location of the finish line, is five degrees. The back stretch, opposite of the front, also has a five degree banking. The track layout is similar to Atlanta Motor Speedway and Charlotte Motor Speedway, tracks also owned by Speedway Motorsports.

Failed to qualify: Robby Gordon (#13), Dave Marcis (#71), Wally Dallenbach Jr. (#75), Kyle Petty (#44), Todd Bodine (#91)

Top 10 results

Post-race standings

References

DirecTV 500
DirecTV 500
NASCAR races at Texas Motor Speedway